Paraplatyptilia glacialis is a moth of the family Pterophoridae. It is found in North America, including the type location St. Mary in Glacier County, Montana.

References

Moths described in 2008
glacialis